Jeffrey Charles Long is an American genetic anthropologist. He has been a tenured professor in the department of anthropology at the University of New Mexico since 2009, and a professor in the department of biology there since 2013. Before joining the University of New Mexico, he taught at the University of Michigan Medical School; before that, he worked at the National Institute on Alcohol Abuse and Alcoholism. He is a member of the American Society of Human Genetics. In April 2010, he presented a study at a meeting of the American Association of Physical Anthropologists which found evidence that early humans interbred with Neanderthals. He has also studied the relationship between race and genetics, with his collaborators on this topic including Kenneth M. Weiss and Rick Kittles.

References

External links
Faculty page

American anthropologists
Living people
American geneticists
University of New Mexico faculty
University of Michigan faculty
University of Michigan alumni
Year of birth missing (living people)